The 1931 United Kingdom general election in Northern Ireland was held on 27 October as part of the wider general election. There were ten constituencies, seven single-seat constituencies with MPs elected by FPTP and three two-seat constituencies with MPs elected by bloc voting.

Results
This election saw no change in the distribution of seats from Northern Ireland.

In the election as a whole, a National Government which had been formed before the election was returned with Ramsay MacDonald of National Labour as Prime Minister. Also in the government were the Conservative Party, which included the Ulster Unionists, and the Liberal Party.

MPs elected

References

Northern Ireland
1931
1931 elections in Northern Ireland
October 1931 events